Domodedovsky District was an administrative district (raion) of Moscow Oblast, Russia, which was municipally incorporated as Domodedovo Urban Okrug. Its administrative center was the town of Domodedovo. District's population:  The population of Domodedovo accounted for 71.0% of the district's total population.

History
The district was established on April 29, 1969, when its territory was split from Podolsky District. It was abolished on April 1, 2011, with its territory re-organized as the Domodedovo Town Under Oblast Jurisdiction; the municipal status as the urban okrug was unaffected.

References

Districts of Moscow Oblast
States and territories established in 1969
States and territories disestablished in 2011

